Nur-Islam Adymovich Dzhabrailov (born 16 August 1992) is a former Russian footballer.

Career
Dzhabrailov made his professional debut for FC Terek Grozny on 13 July 2010 in the Russian Cup game against FC Luch-Energiya Vladivostok.

External links
 
 Player page on the official FC Terek Grozny website 
 
 

1992 births
Living people
Russian footballers
Association football midfielders
FC Akhmat Grozny players
Place of birth missing (living people)